The Good Guy is a 2009 romantic comedy film directed by Julio DePietro starring Alexis Bledel, Scott Porter, and Bryan Greenberg. The story is a loose adaptation of Ford Madox Ford's 1915 novel The Good Soldier, which is referenced several times in the film's plot.

Plot

Tommy Fielding is young, clever, charming, and attractive. He has got a smart, beautiful girlfriend, Beth, a young Manhattanite and urban conservationist. He's also very good at his investment broker job, impressing his ruthless, cynical boss, Cash. When a key member of Tommy's sales team suddenly leaves for a competitor, Tommy needs to fill his spot quickly, and takes a chance on the bumbling Daniel, a former avionics engineer and computer geek who seems a bit naïve about high finance and a bit nervous around women. Tommy takes Daniel under his wing, showing him how to dress, where to socialize, and how to charm attractive women. Their relationship is threatened when Daniel begins spending more time with Beth, joining her book club, and becoming her confidant. Tommy begins to question his decision to share his wisdom with Daniel, while Daniel is forced to decide what success really means to him, and where his loyalties lie in life.

Cast
 Alexis Bledel as Beth Vest 
 Scott Porter as Tommy Fielding
 Bryan Greenberg as Daniel Seaver
 Anna Chlumsky as Lisa
 Andrew McCarthy as Cash
 Aaron Yoo as Steve-O
 Andrew Stewart-Jones as Shakespeare
 Denise Vasi as Suki
 Jessalyn Wanlim as Jordan
 Eric Thal as Stephens
 Kate Nauta as Cynthia
 Colin Egglesfield as Baker
 Adam LeFevre as Billy
 Jackie Stewart as Sofia
 Monica Steuer as Florist
 Darrin Baker as Bobby
 Adrian Martinez as Larry

Soundtracks
 The Helio Sequence - Lately
 Let's Go Sailing - Sideways
 Sam Champion - Like a Secret
 White Denim - Let's Talk About It
 Born Ruffians - I Need a Life
 Atmosphere - Party Over Here
 Wang Chung - Everybody Have Fun Tonight
 The Helio Sequence - Don't Look Away
 The Cliks - Oh Yeah
 Ra Ra Riot - Can You Tell
 Plushgun - Just Impolite
 Mancino - Lavender Lake
 Copperpot - The Art of Rap
 Sam Champion - Be Mine Everyone
 Rachel Platten - Seven Weeks
 Stars - Your Ex-Lover Is Dead
 Say Hi - Hallie and Henry

Reception
On Rotten Tomatoes the film has an approval rating of 35% based on reviews from 26 critics. On Metacritic the film has a score of 47% based on reviews from 13 critics, indicating "mixed or average reviews".

Roger Ebert of the Chicago Sun-Times gave it 3 out of 4 and wrote: "It has smart characters, and is wise about the ones who try to tame their intelligence by acting out."

Andrew Barker of Variety wrote, that "Lacking much of a satirical bite, the pic's quasi-celebration of crude laddishness becomes oppressive."

References

External links
 
 
 

2009 films
American romantic comedy films
2009 romantic comedy films
Films scored by Tomandandy
2000s English-language films
2000s American films